A boosted fission weapon usually refers to a type of nuclear bomb that uses a small amount of fusion fuel to increase the rate, and thus yield, of a fission reaction. The neutrons released by the fusion reactions add to the neutrons released due to fission, allowing for more neutron-induced fission reactions to take place. The rate of fission is thereby greatly increased such that much more of the fissile material is able to undergo fission before the core explosively disassembles. The fusion process itself adds only a small amount of energy to the process, perhaps 1%.

The alternative meaning is an obsolete type of single-stage nuclear bomb that uses thermonuclear fusion on a large scale to create fast neutrons that can cause fission in depleted uranium, but which is not a two-stage hydrogen bomb. This type of bomb was referred to by Edward Teller as "Alarm Clock", and by Andrei Sakharov as "Sloika" or "Layer Cake" (Teller and Sakharov developed the idea independently, as far as is known).

Development 
The idea of boosting was originally developed between late 1947 and late 1949 at Los Alamos. The primary benefit of boosting is further miniaturization of nuclear weapons as it reduces the minimum inertial confinement time required for a supercritical nuclear explosion by providing a sudden influx of fast neutrons before the critical mass would blow itself apart. This would eliminate the need for an aluminum pusher and uranium tamper and the explosives needed to push them and the fissile material into a supercritical state.

Gas boosting in modern nuclear weapons
In a fission bomb, the fissile fuel is "assembled" quickly by a uniform spherical implosion created with conventional explosives, producing a supercritical mass. In this state, many of the neutrons released by the fissioning of a nucleus will induce fission of other nuclei in the fuel mass, also releasing additional neutrons, leading to a chain reaction. This reaction consumes at most 20% of the fuel before the bomb blows itself apart, or possibly much less if conditions are not ideal: the Little Boy (gun type mechanism) and Fat Man (implosion type mechanism) bombs had efficiencies of 1.38% and 13%, respectively.

Fusion boosting is achieved by introducing tritium and deuterium gas.  Solid lithium deuteride-tritide has also been used in some cases, but gas allows more flexibility (and can be stored externally) and can be injected into a hollow cavity at the center of the sphere of fission fuel, or into a gap between an outer layer and a "levitated" inner core, sometime before implosion. By the time about 1% of the fission fuel has fissioned, the temperature rises high enough to cause thermonuclear fusion, which produces relatively large numbers of neutrons, speeding up the late stages of the chain reaction and approximately doubling its efficiency.

Deuterium-tritium fusion neutrons are extremely energetic, seven times more energetic than an average fission neutron, which makes them much more likely to be captured in the fissile material and lead to fission. This is due to several reasons:

 When these energetic neutrons strike a fissile nucleus, a much larger number of secondary neutrons are released by the fission (e.g. 4.6 vs 2.9 for Pu-239).
 The fission cross section is larger both in absolute terms, and in proportion to the scattering and capture cross sections.

Taking these factors into account, the maximum alpha value for D-T fusion neutrons in plutonium (density 19.8 g/cm3) is some 8 times higher than for an average fission neutron (2.5 vs 3).

A sense of the potential contribution of fusion boosting can be gained by observing that the complete fusion of one mole of tritium (3 grams) and one mole of deuterium (2 grams) would produce one mole of neutrons (1 gram), which, neglecting escape losses and scattering for the moment, could fission one mole (239 grams) of plutonium directly, producing 4.6 moles of secondary neutrons, which can in turn fission another 4.6 moles of plutonium (1,099 g). The fission of this 1,338 g of plutonium in the first two generations would release 23 kilotons of TNT equivalent (97 TJ) of energy, and would by itself result in a 29.7% efficiency for a bomb containing 4.5 kg of plutonium (a typical small fission trigger). The energy released by the fusion of the 5 g of fusion fuel itself is only 1.73% of the energy released by the fission of 1,338 g of plutonium. Larger total yields and higher efficiency are possible, since the chain reaction can continue beyond the second generation after fusion boosting.

Fusion-boosted fission bombs can also be made immune to neutron radiation from nearby nuclear explosions, which can cause other designs to predetonate, blowing themselves apart without achieving a high yield.
The combination of reduced weight in relation to yield and immunity to radiation has ensured that most modern nuclear weapons are fusion-boosted.

The fusion reaction rate typically becomes significant at 20 to 30 megakelvins. This temperature is reached at very low efficiencies, when less than 1% of the fissile material has fissioned (corresponding to a yield in the range of hundreds of tons of TNT). Since implosion weapons can be designed that will achieve yields in this range even if neutrons are present at the moment of criticality, fusion boosting allows the manufacture of efficient weapons that are immune to predetonation. Elimination of this hazard is a very important advantage in using boosting. It appears that every weapon now in the U.S. arsenal is a boosted design.

According to one weapons designer, boosting is mainly responsible for the remarkable 100-fold increase in the efficiency of fission weapons since 1945.

Some early non-staged thermonuclear weapon designs
Early thermonuclear weapon designs such as the Joe-4, the Soviet "Layer Cake" ("Sloika"), used large amounts of fusion to induce fission in the uranium-238 atoms that make up depleted uranium. These weapons had a fissile core surrounded by a layer of lithium-6 deuteride, in turn surrounded by a layer of depleted uranium. Some designs (including the layer cake) had several alternate layers of these materials. The Soviet Layer Cake was similar to the American Alarm Clock design, which was never built, and the British Green Bamboo design, which was built but never tested.

When this type of bomb explodes, the fission of the highly enriched uranium or plutonium core creates neutrons, some of which escape and strike atoms of lithium-6, creating tritium. At the temperature created by fission in the core, tritium and deuterium can undergo thermonuclear fusion without a high level of compression. The fusion of tritium and deuterium produces a neutron with an energy of 14 MeV—a much higher energy than the 1 MeV of the neutron that began the reaction. This creation of high-energy neutrons, rather than energy yield, is the main purpose of fusion in this kind of weapon. This 14 MeV neutron then strikes an atom of uranium-238, causing fission: without this fusion stage, the original 1 MeV neutron hitting an atom of uranium-238 would probably have just been absorbed. This fission then releases energy and also neutrons, which then create more tritium from the remaining lithium-6, and so on, in a continuous cycle. Energy from fission of uranium-238 is useful in weapons: both because depleted uranium is much cheaper than highly enriched uranium and because it cannot go critical and is therefore less likely to be involved in a catastrophic accident.

This kind of thermonuclear weapon can produce up to 20% of its yield from fusion, with the rest coming from fission, and is limited in yield to less than one megaton of TNT (4 PJ) equivalent. Joe-4 yielded 400 kilotons of TNT (1.7 PJ). In comparison, a "true" hydrogen bomb can produce up to 97% of its yield from fusion, and its explosive yield is limited only by device size.

Maintenance of gas boosted nuclear weapons
Tritium is a radioactive isotope with a half-life of 12.355 years. Its main decay product is helium-3, which is among the nuclides with the largest cross-section for neutron capture. Therefore, periodically the weapon must have its helium waste flushed out and its tritium supply recharged. This is because any helium-3 in the weapon's tritium supply would act as a poison during the weapon's detonation, absorbing neutrons meant to collide with the nuclei of its fission fuel.

Tritium is relatively expensive to produce because each triton - the tritium nucleus (triton (physics)) - produced requires production of at least one free neutron which is used to bombard a feedstock material (lithium-6, deuterium, or helium-3). Actually, because of losses and inefficiencies, the number of free neutrons needed is closer to two for each triton produced (and tritium begins decaying immediately, so there are losses during collection, storage, and transport from the production facility to the weapons in the field.) The production of free neutrons demands the operation of either a breeder reactor or a particle accelerator (with a spallation target) dedicated to the tritium production facility.

See also
 History of the Teller–Ulam design
 Nuclear weapon design
 Thermonuclear weapon

References

Nuclear weapon design
Nuclear fission
Los Alamos National Laboratory
American inventions
1947 in science
1947 in the United States
Edward Teller